Urothoidae is a family of small marine amphipod crustaceans. Members of the family are found worldwide and are mainly detritivores and interface grazers, though some are also facultative filter feeders.

Genera

References

Gammaridea
Crustacean families